The 1987–88 FIBA European Champions Cup season was the 31st season of the FIBA European Champions Cup (now called EuroLeague). It was won by Tracer Milano, after they beat Maccabi Elite Tel Aviv 90-84. It was the first season in the competition's modern era where the Final Four format was used to decide the champion. The 1988 FIBA European Champions Cup Final Four was held at Flanders Expo Pavilion in Ghent, Belgium, on 5–7 April 1988. Bob McAdoo was named Final Four MVP.

Competition system

 23 teams (European national domestic league champions only), playing in a tournament system, played knock-out rounds on a home and away basis. The aggregate score of both games decided the winner.
 The eight remaining teams after the knock-out rounds entered a Quarterfinal Group Stage, played as a round-robin. The final standings were based on individual wins and defeats. In case of a tie between two or more teams after the group stage, the following criteria were used: 1) number of wins in one-to-one games between the teams; 2) basket average between the teams; 3) general basket average within the group.
 The top four teams after the Quarterfinal Group Stage qualified for the final stage (Final Four), played at a predetermined venue.

First round

|}

Round of 16

|}

Quarterfinal round

Final four

Semifinals 
April 5, Flanders Expo, Ghent

|}

3rd place game
April 7, Flanders Expo, Ghent

|}

Final
April 7, Flanders Expo, Ghent

|}

Final standings

Awards

FIBA European Champions Cup Final Four MVP
 Bob McAdoo ( Tracer Milano)

FIBA European Champions Cup Finals Top Scorer
 Bob McAdoo ( Tracer Milano)

References

External links
1987–88 FIBA European Champions Cup
1987–88 FIBA European Champions Cup
Champions Cup 1987–88 Line-ups and Stats

FIBA
EuroLeague seasons